Deepfakes (a portmanteau of "deep learning" and "fake") are synthetic media in which a person in an existing image or video is replaced with someone else's likeness. While the act of creating fake content is not new, deepfakes leverage powerful techniques from machine learning and artificial intelligence to manipulate or generate visual and audio content that can more easily deceive. The main machine learning methods used to create deepfakes are based on deep learning and involve training generative neural network architectures, such as autoencoders, or generative adversarial networks (GANs).

Deepfakes have garnered widespread attention for their potential use in creating child sexual abuse material, celebrity pornographic videos, revenge porn, fake news, hoaxes, bullying, and financial fraud. This has elicited responses from both industry and government to detect and limit their use.

From traditional entertainment to gaming, deepfake technology has evolved to be increasingly convincing and available to the public, allowing the disruption of the entertainment and media industries.

History 
Photo manipulation was developed in the 19th century and soon applied to motion pictures. Technology steadily improved during the 20th century, and more quickly with the advent of digital video.

Deepfake technology has been developed by researchers at academic institutions beginning in the 1990s, and later by amateurs in online communities. More recently the methods have been adopted by industry.

Academic research 
Academic research related to deepfakes is split between the field of computer vision, a subfield of computer science, which develops techniques for creating and identifying deepfakes, and humanities and social science approaches that study the social, ethical and aesthetic implications of deepfakes.

Social science and humanities approaches to deepfakes 
In cinema studies, deepfakes demonstrate how "the human face is emerging as a central object of ambivalence in the digital age". Video artists have used deepfakes to "playfully rewrite film history by retrofitting canonical cinema with new star performers". Film scholar Christopher Holliday analyses how the switching out gender and race of performers in familiar movie scenes destabilise gender classifications and categories. The idea of "queering" deepfakes is also discussed in Oliver M. Gingrich's discussion of media artworks that use deepfakes to reframe gender, including British artist Jake Elwes' Zizi: Queering the Dataset, an artwork that uses deepfakes of drag queens to intentionally play with gender. The aesthetic potentials of deepfakes are also beginning to be explored. Theatre historian John Fletcher notes that early demonstrations of deepfakes are presented as performances, and situates these in the context of theatre, discussing "some of the more troubling paradigm shifts" that deepfakes represent as a performance genre.

Philosophers and media scholars have discussed the ethics of deepfakes especially in relation to pornography. Media scholar Emily van der Nagel draws upon research in photography studies on manipulated images to discuss verification systems that allow women to consent to uses of their images.

Beyond pornography, deepfakes have been framed by philosophers as an "epistemic threat" to knowledge and thus to society. There are several other suggestions for how to deal with the risks deepfakes give rise beyond pornography, but also to corporations, politicians and others, of "exploitation, intimidation, and personal sabotage", and there are several scholarly discussions of potential legal and regulatory responses both in legal studies and media studies. In psychology and media studies, scholars discuss the effects of disinformation that uses deepfakes, and the social impact of deepfakes.

While most English-language academic studies of deepfakes focus on the Western anxieties about disinformation and pornography, digital anthropologist Gabriele de Seta has analysed the Chinese reception of deepfakes, which are known as huanlian, which translates to "changing faces". The Chinese term does not contain the "fake" of the English deepfake, and de Seta argues that this cultural context may explain why the Chinese response has been more about practical regulatory responses to "fraud risks, image rights, economic profit, and ethical imbalances".

Computer science research on deepfakes 
An early landmark project was the Video Rewrite program, published in 1997, which modified existing video footage of a person speaking to depict that person mouthing the words contained in a different audio track. It was the first system to fully automate this kind of facial reanimation, and it did so using machine learning techniques to make connections between the sounds produced by a video's subject and the shape of the subject's face.

Contemporary academic projects have focused on creating more realistic videos and on improving techniques. The "Synthesizing Obama" program, published in 2017, modifies video footage of former president Barack Obama to depict him mouthing the words contained in a separate audio track. The project lists as a main research contribution its photorealistic technique for synthesizing mouth shapes from audio. The Face2Face program, published in 2016, modifies video footage of a person's face to depict them mimicking the facial expressions of another person in real time. The project lists as a main research contribution the first method for re-enacting facial expressions in real time using a camera that does not capture depth, making it possible for the technique to be performed using common consumer cameras.

In August 2018, researchers at the University of California, Berkeley published a paper introducing a fake dancing app that can create the impression of masterful dancing ability using AI. This project expands the application of deepfakes to the entire body; previous works focused on the head or parts of the face.

Researchers have also shown that deepfakes are expanding into other domains such as tampering with medical imagery.  In this work, it was shown how an attacker can automatically inject or remove lung cancer in a patient's 3D CT scan. The result was so convincing that it fooled three radiologists and a state-of-the-art lung cancer detection AI. To demonstrate the threat, the authors successfully performed the attack on a hospital in a White hat penetration test.

A survey of deepfakes, published in May 2020, provides a timeline of how the creation and detection deepfakes have advanced over the last few years. The survey identifies that researchers have been focusing on resolving the following challenges of deepfake creation:

 Generalization.  High-quality deepfakes are often achieved by training on hours of footage of the target. This challenge is to minimize the amount of training data and the time to train the model required to produce quality images and to enable the execution of trained models on new identities (unseen during training).
 Paired Training. Training a supervised model can produce high-quality results, but requires data pairing. This is the process of finding examples of inputs and their desired outputs for the model to learn from. Data pairing is laborious and impractical when training on multiple identities and facial behaviors. Some solutions include self-supervised training (using frames from the same video), the use of unpaired networks such as Cycle-GAN, or the manipulation of network embeddings.
 Identity leakage.  This is where the identity of the driver (i.e., the actor controlling the face in a reenactment) is partially transferred to the generated face. Some solutions proposed include attention mechanisms, few-shot learning, disentanglement, boundary conversions, and skip connections.
 Occlusions. When part of the face is obstructed with a hand, hair, glasses, or any other item then artifacts can occur. A common occlusion is a closed mouth which hides the inside of the mouth and the teeth. Some solutions include image segmentation during training and in-painting.
 Temporal coherence. In videos containing deepfakes, artifacts such as flickering and jitter can occur because the network has no context of the preceding frames. Some researchers provide this context or use novel temporal coherence losses to help improve realism. As the technology improves, the interference is diminishing.

Overall, deepfakes are expected to have several implications in media and society, media production, media representations, media audiences, gender, law, and regulation, and politics.

Amateur development 
The term deepfakes originated around the end of 2017 from a Reddit user named "deepfakes". He, as well as others in the Reddit community r/deepfakes, shared deepfakes they created; many videos involved celebrities' faces swapped onto the bodies of actresses in pornographic videos, while non-pornographic content included many videos with actor Nicolas Cage's face swapped into various movies.

Other online communities remain, including Reddit communities that do not share pornography, such as r/SFWdeepfakes (short for "safe for work deepfakes"), in which community members share deepfakes depicting celebrities, politicians, and others in non-pornographic scenarios. Other online communities continue to share pornography on platforms that have not banned deepfake pornography.

Commercial development 
In January 2018, a proprietary desktop application called FakeApp was launched. This app allows users to easily create and share videos with their faces swapped with each other. As of 2019, FakeApp has been superseded by open-source alternatives such as Faceswap, command line-based DeepFaceLab, and web-based apps such as DeepfakesWeb.com 

Larger companies started to use deepfakes. Corporate training videos can be created using deepfaked avatars and their voices, for example Synthesia, which uses deepfake technology with avatars to create personalized videos. The mobile app giant Momo created the application Zao which allows users to superimpose their face on television and movie clips with a single picture. As of 2019 the Japanese AI company DataGrid made a full body deepfake that could create a person from scratch. They intend to use these for fashion and apparel.

As of 2020 audio deepfakes, and AI software capable of detecting deepfakes and cloning human voices after 5 seconds of listening time also exist. A mobile deepfake app, Impressions, was launched in March 2020. It was the first app for the creation of celebrity deepfake videos from mobile phones.

Resurrection 
Deepfakes technology can not only be used to fabricate messages and actions of others, but it can also be used to revive deceased individuals. On 29 October 2020, Kim Kardashian posted a video of her late father Robert Kardashian; the face in the video of Robert Kardashian was created with deepfake technology. This hologram was created by the company Kaleida, where they use a combination of performance, motion tracking, SFX, VFX and DeepFake technologies in their hologram creation.

In 2020, Joaquin Oliver, victim of the Parkland shooting was resurrected with deepfake technology. Oliver's parents teamed up on behalf of their organization Nonprofit Change the Ref, with McCann Health to produce this deepfake video advocating for gun-safety voting campaign. In this deepfake message, it shows Joaquin encouraging viewers to vote.

In 2022, Elvis Presley has been resurrected in America's Got Talent 17 using deepfake technology.

There have been deepfake resurrections of pop cultural and historical figures who were murdered, for example, the member of The Beatles, John Lennon who was murdered in 1980.

Techniques 
Deepfakes rely on a type of neural network called an autoencoder. These consist of an encoder, which reduces an image to a lower dimensional latent space, and a decoder, which reconstructs the image from the latent representation. Deepfakes utilize this architecture by having a universal encoder which encodes a person in to the latent space. The latent representation contains key features about their facial features and body posture. This can then be decoded with a model trained specifically for the target. This means the target's detailed information will be superimposed on the underlying facial and body features of the original video, represented in the latent space.

A popular upgrade to this architecture attaches a generative adversarial network to the decoder. A GAN trains a generator, in this case the decoder, and a discriminator in an adversarial relationship. The generator creates new images from the latent representation of the source material, while the discriminator attempts to determine whether or not the image is generated. This causes the generator to create images that mimic reality extremely well as any defects would be caught by the discriminator. Both algorithms improve constantly in a zero sum game. This makes deepfakes difficult to combat as they are constantly evolving; any time a defect is determined, it can be corrected.

Applications

Blackmail 
Deepfakes can be used to generate blackmail materials that falsely incriminate a victim. A report by the American Congressional Research Service warned that deepfakes could be used to blackmail elected officials or those with access to classified information for espionage or influence purposes.

Alternatively, since the fakes cannot reliably be distinguished from genuine materials, victims of actual blackmail can now claim that the true artifacts are fakes, granting them plausible deniability. The effect is to void credibility of existing blackmail materials, which erases loyalty to blackmailers and destroys the blackmailer's control. This phenomenon can be termed "blackmail inflation", since it "devalues" real blackmail, rendering it worthless. It is possible to utilize commodity GPU hardware with a small software program to generate this blackmail content for any number of subjects in huge quantities, driving up the supply of fake blackmail content limitlessly and in highly scalable fashion.

Pornography 

In 2017, Deepfake pornography prominently surfaced on the Internet, particularly on Reddit. As of 2019, many deepfakes on the internet feature pornography of female celebrities whose likeness is typically used without their consent.  A report published in October 2019 by Dutch cybersecurity startup Deeptrace estimated that 96% of all deepfakes online were pornographic. 
As of 2018, a Daisy Ridley deepfake first captured attention, among others. As of October 2019, most of the deepfake subjects on the internet were British and American actresses. However, around a quarter of the subjects are South Korean, the majority of which are K-pop stars.

In June 2019, a downloadable Windows and Linux application called DeepNude was released that used neural networks, specifically generative adversarial networks, to remove clothing from images of women. The app had both a paid and unpaid version, the paid version costing $50. On 27 June the creators removed the application and refunded consumers.

Politics 
Deepfakes have been used to misrepresent well-known politicians in videos.

 In April 2018, Jordan Peele collaborated with Buzzfeed to create a deepfake of Barack Obama with Peele's voice; it served as a public service announcement to increase awareness of deepfakes.
 In 2018, in separate videos, the face of the Argentine President Mauricio Macri had been replaced by the face of Adolf Hitler, and Angela Merkel's face has been replaced with Donald Trump's.
 In January 2019, Fox affiliate KCPQ aired a deepfake of Trump during his Oval Office address, mocking his appearance and skin color. The employee found responsible for the video was subsequently fired.
 In June 2019, the United States House Intelligence Committee held hearings on the potential malicious use of deepfakes to sway elections.
 In April 2020, the Belgian branch of Extinction Rebellion published a deepfake video of Belgian Prime Minister Sophie Wilmès on Facebook. The video promoted a possible link between deforestation and COVID-19. It had more than 100,000 views within 24 hours and received many comments. On the Facebook page where the video appeared, many users interpreted the deepfake video as genuine.
 During the 2020 US Presidential campaign, many deep fakes surfaced purporting Joe Biden in cognitive decline—falling asleep during an interview, getting lost, and misspeaking—all bolstering rumors of his decline.
 During the 2020 Delhi Legislative Assembly election campaign, the Delhi Bharatiya Janata Party used similar technology to distribute a version of an English-language campaign advertisement by its leader, Manoj Tiwari, translated into Haryanvi to target Haryana voters. A voiceover was provided by an actor, and AI trained using video of Tiwari speeches was used to lip-sync the video to the new voiceover. A party staff member described it as a "positive" use of deepfake technology, which allowed them to "convincingly approach the target audience even if the candidate didn't speak the language of the voter."
In 2020, Bruno Sartori produced deepfakes parodying politicians like Jair Bolsonaro and Donald Trump.
 In April 2021, politicians in a number of European countries were approached by pranksters Vovan and Lexus, who are accused by critics of working for the Russian state. They impersonated Leonid Volkov, a Russian opposition politician and chief of staff of the Russian opposition leader Alexei Navalny's campaign, allegedly through deepfake technology. However, the pair told The Verge that they did not use deepfakes, and just used a look-alike.

Art
In March 2018 the multidisciplinary artist Joseph Ayerle published the video artwork Un'emozione per sempre 2.0 (English title: The Italian Game). The artist worked with Deepfake technology to create an AI actress, a synthetic version of 80s movie star Ornella Muti, traveling in time from 1978 to 2018. The Massachusetts Institute of Technology referred this artwork in the study "Collective Wisdom". The artist used Ornella Muti's time travel to explore generational reflections, while also investigating questions about the role of provocation in the world of art. For the technical realization Ayerle used scenes of photo model Kendall Jenner. The program replaced Jenner's face by an AI calculated face of Ornella Muti. As a result, the AI actress has the face of the Italian actress Ornella Muti and the body of Kendall Jenner.

Deepfakes have been widely used in satire or to parody celebrities and politicians. The 2020 webseries Sassy Justice, created by Trey Parker and Matt Stone, heavily features the use of deepfaked public figures to satirize current events and raise awareness of deepfake technology.

Acting
There has been speculation about deepfakes being used for creating digital actors for future films. Digitally constructed/altered humans have already been used in films before, and deepfakes could contribute new developments in the near future. Deepfake technology has already been used by fans to insert faces into existing films, such as the insertion of Harrison Ford's young face onto Han Solo's face in Solo: A Star Wars Story, and techniques similar to those used by deepfakes were used for the acting of Princess Leia and Grand Moff Tarkin in Rogue One.

As deepfake technology increasingly advances, Disney has improved their visual effects using high-resolution deepfake face swapping technology. Disney improved their technology through progressive training programmed to identify facial expressions, implementing a face-swapping feature, and iterating in order to stabilize and refine the output. This high-resolution deepfake technology saves significant operational and production costs. Disney's deepfake generation model can produce AI-generated media at a 1024 x 1024 resolution, as opposed to common models that produce media at a 256 x 256 resolution. The technology allows Disney to  characters or revive deceased actors.

The 2020 documentary Welcome to Chechnya used deepfake technology to obscure the identity of the people interviewed, so as to protect them from retaliation.

Entertainment 
On June 8, 2022, Daniel Emmet, a former AGT contestant, teamed up with the AI startup Metaphysic AI, to create a hyperrealistic deepfake to make it appear as Simon Cowell. Cowell, notoriously known for severely critiquing contestants, was on stage interpreting "You're The Inspiration" by Chicago. Emmet sang on stage as an image of Simon Cowell emerged on the screen behind him in flawless synchronicity.

On August 30, 2022, Metaphysic AI had 'deep-fake' Simon Cowell, Howie Mandel and Terry Crews singing opera on stage.

On September 13, 2022, Metaphysic AI performed with a synthetic version of Elvis Presley for the finals of America's Got Talent.

The MIT artificial intelligence project 15.ai has been used for content creation for multiple Internet fandoms, particularly on social media.

Internet meme
In the series, the melancholic song is sung by the player in a karaoke minigame. Most iterations of this meme use a 2017 video uploaded by user Dobbsyrules, who lip syncs the song, as a template.

Social media 
Deepfakes have begun to see use in popular social media platforms, notably through Zao, a Chinese deepfake app that allows users to substitute their own faces onto those of characters in scenes from films and television shows such as Romeo + Juliet and Game of Thrones. The app originally faced scrutiny over its invasive user data and privacy policy, after which the company put out a statement claiming it would revise the policy. In January 2020 Facebook announced that it was introducing new measures to counter this on its platforms.

The Congressional Research Service cited unspecified evidence as showing that foreign intelligence operatives used deepfakes to create social media accounts with the purposes of recruiting individuals with access to classified information.

In 2021, realistic deepfake videos of actor Tom Cruise were released on TikTok, which went viral and garnered more than tens of millions of views. The deepfake videos featured an "artificial intelligence-generated doppelganger" of Cruise doing various activities such as teeing off at the golf course, showing off a coin trick, and biting into a lollipop. The creator of the clips, Belgian VFX Artist Chris Umé, said he first got interested in deepfakes in 2018 and saw the "creative potential" of them.

Sockpuppets
Deepfake photographs can be used to create sockpuppets, non-existent people, who are active both online and in traditional media. A deepfake photograph appears to have been generated together with a legend for an apparently non-existent person named Oliver Taylor, whose identity was described as a university student in the United Kingdom. The Oliver Taylor persona submitted opinion pieces in several newspapers and was active in online media attacking a British legal academic and his wife, as "terrorist sympathizers." The academic had drawn international attention in 2018 when he commenced a lawsuit in Israel against NSO, a surveillance company, on behalf of people in Mexico who alleged they were victims of NSO's phone hacking technology. Reuters could find only scant records for Oliver Taylor and "his" university had no records for him. Many experts agreed that the profile photo is a deepfake. Several newspapers have not retracted articles attributed to him or removed them from their websites. It is feared that such techniques are a new battleground in disinformation.

Collections of deepfake photographs of non-existent people on social networks have also been deployed as part of Israeli partisan propaganda. The Facebook page "Zionist Spring" featured photos of non-existent persons along with their "testimonies" purporting to explain why they have abandoned their left-leaning politics to embrace the right-wing, and the page also contained large numbers of posts from Prime Minister of Israel Benjamin Netanyahu and his son and from other Israeli right wing sources. The photographs appear to have been generated by "human image synthesis" technology, computer software that takes data from photos of real people to produce a realistic composite image of a non-existent person. In much of the "testimony," the reason given for embracing the political right was the shock of learning of alleged incitement to violence against the prime minister. Right wing Israeli television broadcasters then broadcast the "testimony" of these non-existent person based on the fact that they were being "shared" online. The broadcasters aired the story, even though the broadcasters could not find such people, explaining "Why does the origin matter?" Other Facebook fake profiles—profiles of fictitious individuals—contained material that allegedly contained such incitement against the right wing prime minister, in response to which the prime minister complained that there was a plot to murder him.

Concerns

Fraud
Audio deepfakes have been used as part of social engineering scams, fooling people into thinking they are receiving instructions from a trusted individual. In 2019, a U.K.-based energy firm's CEO was scammed over the phone when he was ordered to transfer €220,000 into a Hungarian bank account by an individual who used audio deepfake technology to impersonate the voice of the firm's parent company's chief executive.

Credibility and authenticity 
Though fake photos have long been plentiful, faking motion pictures has been more difficult, and the presence of deepfakes increases the difficulty of classifying videos as genuine or not. AI researcher Alex Champandard has said people should know how fast things can be corrupted with deepfake technology, and that the problem is not a technical one, but rather one to be solved by trust in information and journalism. Deepfakes can be leveraged to defame, impersonate, and spread disinformation. The primary pitfall is that humanity could fall into an age in which it can no longer be determined whether a medium's content corresponds to the truth.

Similarly, computer science associate professor Hao Li of the University of Southern California states that deepfakes created for malicious use, such as fake news, will be even more harmful if nothing is done to spread awareness of deepfake technology. Li predicted that genuine videos and deepfakes would become indistinguishable in as soon as half a year, as of October 2019, due to rapid advancement in artificial intelligence and computer graphics.

Former Google fraud czar Shuman Ghosemajumder has called deepfakes an area of "societal concern" and said that they will inevitably evolve to a point at which they can be generated automatically, and an individual could use that technology to produce millions of deepfake videos.

The consequences of a deepfake are not significant enough to destabilize the entire government system; however, deepfakes possess the ability to damage individual entities tremendously. This is because deepfakes are often targeted at one individual, and/or their relations to others in hopes to create a narrative powerful enough to influence public opinion or beliefs. This can be done through deepfake voice phishing, which manipulates audio to create fake phone calls or conversations. Another method of deepfake use is fabricated private remarks, which manipulate media to convey individuals voicing damaging comments.

In September 2020 Microsoft made public that they are developing a Deepfake detection software tool.

Example events

Barack Obama 
On April 17, 2018, American actor Jordan Peele, BuzzFeed, and Monkeypaw Productions posted a deepfake of Barack Obama to YouTube, which depicted Barack Obama cursing and calling Donald Trump names. In this deepfake Peele's voice and face were transformed and manipulated into those of Obama. The intent of this video was to portray the dangerous consequences and power of deepfakes, and how deepfakes can make anyone say anything.

Donald Trump 
On May 5, 2019, Derpfakes posted a deepfake of Donald Trump to YouTube, based on a skit Jimmy Fallon performed on NBC's The Tonight Show. In the original skit (aired May 4, 2016), Jimmy Fallon dressed as Donald Trump and pretended to participate in a phone call with Barack Obama, conversing in a manner that presented him to be bragging about his primary win in Indiana. In the deepfake, Jimmy Fallon's face was transformed into Donald Trump's face, with the audio remaining the same. This deepfake video was produced by Derpfakes with a comedic intent.

Nancy Pelosi

In 2019, a clip from Nancy Pelosi's speech at the Center for American Progress (given on May 22, 2019) in which the video was slowed down, in addition to the pitch of the audio being altered, to make it seem as if she were drunk, was widely distributed on social media. Critics argue that this was not a deepfake, but a shallowfake; a less sophisticated form of video manipulation.

Kim Jong-un and Vladimir Putin 

On September 29, 2020, deepfakes of North Korean leader Kim Jong-un and Russian President Vladimir Putin were uploaded to YouTube, created by a nonpartisan advocacy group RepresentUs.

The deepfakes of Kim and Putin were meant to air publicly as commercials to relay the notion that interference by these leaders in US elections would be detrimental to the United States' democracy. The commercials also aimed to shock Americans to realize how fragile democracy is, and how media and news can significantly influence the country's path regardless of credibility. However, while the commercials included an ending comment detailing that the footage was not real, they ultimately did not air due to fears and sensitivity regarding how Americans may react.

Volodymyr Zelenskyy

On March 16, 2022, a one-minute long deepfake video depicting Ukraine's president Volodymyr Zelenskyy seemingly telling his soldiers to lay down their arms and surrender during the 2022 Russian invasion of Ukraine was circulated on social media. Russian social media boosted it, but after it was debunked, Facebook and YouTube removed it. Twitter allowed the video in tweets where it was exposed as a fake, but said it would be taken down if posted to deceive people. Hackers inserted the disinformation into a live scrolling-text news crawl on TV station Ukraine 24, and the video appeared briefly on the station's website in addition to false claims that Zelenskyy had fled his country's capital, Kyiv. It was not immediately clear who created the deepfake, to which Zelenskyy responded with his own video, saying, "We don't plan to lay down any arms. Until our victory."

Wolf News

In late 2022, pro-China propagandists started spreading deepfake videos purporting to be from "Wolf News" that used synthetic actors. The technology was developed by a London company called Synthesia, which markets it as a cheap alternative to live actors for training and HR videos.

Responses

Social media platforms

Twitter 
Twitter is taking active measures to handle synthetic and manipulated media on their platform. In order to prevent disinformation from spreading, Twitter is placing a notice on tweets that contain manipulated media and/or deepfakes that signal to viewers that the media is manipulated. There will also be a warning that appears to users who plan on retweeting, liking, or engaging with the tweet. Twitter will also work to provide users a link next to the tweet containing manipulated or synthetic media that links to a Twitter Moment or credible news article on the related topic—as a debunking action. Twitter also has the ability to remove any tweets containing deepfakes or manipulated media that may pose a harm to users' safety. In order to better improve Twitter's detection of deepfakes and manipulated media, Twitter has asked users who are interested in partnering with them to work on deepfake detection solutions to fill out a form (that is due 27 November 2020).

Facebook 
Facebook has taken efforts towards encouraging the creation of deepfakes in order to develop state of the art deepfake detection software. Facebook was the prominent partner in hosting the Deepfake Detection Challenge (DFDC), held December 2019, to 2114 participants who generated more than 35,000 models. The top performing models with the highest detection accuracy were analyzed for similarities and differences; these findings are areas of interest in further research to improve and refine  deepfake detection models . Facebook has also detailed that the platform will be taking down  media generated with artificial intelligence used to alter an individual's speech. However, media that has been edited to alter the order or context of words in one's message would remain on the site but be labeled as false, since it was not generated by artificial intelligence.

Detection 
Most of the academic research surrounding deepfakes focuses on the detection deepfake videos. One approach to deepfake detection is to use algorithms to recognize patterns and pick up subtle inconsistencies that arise in deepfake videos. For example, researchers have developed automatic systems that examine videos for errors such as irregular blinking patterns of lighting. This approach has been criticized because deepfake detection is characterized by a "moving goal post" where the production of deepfakes continues to change and improve as algorithms to detect deepfakes improve. In order to assess the most effective algorithms for detecting deepfakes, a coalition of leading technology companies hosted the Deepfake Detection Challenge to accelerate the technology for identifying manipulated content. The winning model of the Deepfake Detection Challenge was 65% accurate on the holdout set of 4,000 videos. A team at Massachusetts Institute of Technology published a paper in December 2021 demonstrating that ordinary humans are 69-72% accurate at identifying a random sample of 50 of these videos.

A team at the University of Buffalo published a paper in October 2020 outlining their technique of using reflections of light in the eyes of 
those depicted to spot deepfakes with a high rate of success, even without the use of an AI detection tool, at least for the time being.

Another team led by Wael AbdAlmageed with Visual Intelligence and Multimedia Analytics Laboratory (VIMAL) of the Information Sciences Institute at the University Of Southern California developed two generations  of deepfake detectors based on convolutional neural networks. The first generation  used recurrent neural networks to spot spatio-temporal inconsistencies to identify visual artifacts left by the deepfake generation process. The algorithm archived 96% accuracy on FaceForensics++; the only large-scale deepfake benchmark available at that time. The second generation  used end-to-end deep networks to differentiate between artifacts and high-level semantic facial information using two-branch networks. The first branch propagates color information while the other branch suppresses facial content and amplifies low-level frequencies using Laplacian of Gaussian (LoG). Further, they included a new loss function that learns a compact representation of bona fide faces, while dispersing the representations (i.e. features) of deepfakes. VIMAL's approach showed state-of-the-art performance on FaceForensics++ and Celeb-DF benchmarks, and on March 16th, 2022 (the same day of the release), was used to identify the deepfake of Volodymyr Zelensky out-of-the-box without any retraining or knowledge of the algorithm with which the deepfake was created.

Other techniques suggest that blockchain could be used to verify the source of the media. For instance, a video might have to be verified through the ledger before it is shown on social media platforms. With this technology, only videos from trusted sources would be approved, decreasing the spread of possibly harmful deepfake media.

Digitally signing of all video and imagery by cameras and video cameras, including smartphone cameras, was suggested to fight deepfakes. That allows tracing every photograph or video back to its original owner that can be used to pursue dissidents.

One easy way to uncover deepfake video calls consists in asking the caller to turn sideways.

Internet reaction
Since 2017, Samantha Cole of Vice published a series of articles covering news surrounding deepfake pornography. On 31 January 2018, Gfycat began removing all deepfakes from its site. On Reddit, the r/deepfakes subreddit was banned on 7 February 2018, due to the policy violation of "involuntary pornography". In the same month, representatives from Twitter stated that they would suspend accounts suspected of posting non-consensual deepfake content. Chat site Discord has taken action against deepfakes in the past, and has taken a general stance against deepfakes. In September 2018, Google added "involuntary synthetic pornographic imagery" to its ban list, allowing anyone to request the block of results showing their fake nudes.

In February 2018, Pornhub said that it would ban deepfake videos on its website because it is considered "non consensual content" which violates their terms of service. They also stated previously to Mashable that they will take down content flagged as deepfakes. Writers from Motherboard from Buzzfeed News reported that searching "deepfakes" on Pornhub still returned multiple recent deepfake videos.

Facebook has previously stated that they would not remove deepfakes from their platforms. The videos will instead be flagged as fake by third-parties and then have a lessened priority in user's feeds. This response was prompted in June 2019 after a deepfake featuring a 2016 video of Mark Zuckerberg circulated on Facebook and Instagram.

In May 2022, Google officially changed the terms of service for their Jupyter Notebook colabs, banning the use of their colab service for the purpose of creating deepfakes. This came a few days after a VICE article had been published, claiming that "most deepfakes are non-consensual porn" and that the main use of popular deepfake software DeepFaceLab (DFL), "the most important technology powering the vast majority of this generation of deepfakes" which often was used in combination with Google colabs, would be to create non-consensual pornography, by pointing to the fact that among many other well-known examples of third-party DFL implementations such as deepfakes commissioned by The Walt Disney Company, official music videos, and web series Sassy Justice by the creators of South Park, DFL's GitHub page also links to deepfake porn website Mr. Deepfake and participants of the DFL Discord server also participate on Mr. Deepfakes.

Legal response 

In the United States, there have been some responses to the problems posed by deepfakes. In 2018, the Malicious Deep Fake Prohibition Act was introduced to the US Senate, and in 2019 the DEEPFAKES Accountability Act was introduced in the House of Representatives. Several states have also introduced legislation regarding deepfakes, including Virginia, Texas, California, and New York. On 3 October 2019, California governor Gavin Newsom signed into law Assembly Bills No. 602 and No. 730. Assembly Bill No. 602 provides individuals targeted by sexually explicit deepfake content made without their consent with a cause of action against the content's creator. Assembly Bill No. 730 prohibits the distribution of malicious deepfake audio or visual media targeting a candidate running for public office within 60 days of their election.

In November 2019 China announced that deepfakes and other synthetically faked footage should bear a clear notice about their fakeness starting in 2020. Failure to comply could be considered a crime the Cyberspace Administration of China stated on its website. The Chinese government seems to be reserving the right to prosecute both users and online video platforms failing to abide by the rules.

In the United Kingdom, producers of deepfake material can be prosecuted for harassment, but there are calls to make deepfake a specific crime; in the United States, where charges as varied as identity theft, cyberstalking, and revenge porn have been pursued, the notion of a more comprehensive statute has also been discussed.

In Canada, the Communications Security Establishment released a report which said that deepfakes could be used to interfere in Canadian politics, particularly to discredit politicians and influence voters. As a result, there are multiple ways for citizens in Canada to deal with deepfakes if they are targeted by them.

Response from DARPA 
In 2018, the Defense Advanced Research Projects Agency (DARPA) funded a project where individuals will compete to create AI-generated videos, audio, and images as well as automated tools to detect these deepfakes. In 2019, DARPA hosted a "proposers day" for a project affiliated with the Semantic Forensics Program where researchers were driven to prevent viral spread of AI-manipulated media. DARPA and the Semantic Forensics Program were also working together to detect AI-manipulated media through efforts in training computers to utilize common sense, logical reasoning. In 2020 DARPA created a Media Forensics (MediFor) program, to detect and mitigate the increasing harm that deepfakes and AI-generated media posed, to provide information regarding how the media was created and to address and emphasize the consequential role of deepfakes and their influence upon decision making.

In popular culture
 The 1986 Mid-December issue of Analog magazine published the novelette "Picaper" by Jack Wodhams. Its plot revolves around digitally enhanced or digitally generated videos produced by skilled hackers serving unscrupulous lawyers and political figures.
 The 1987 film The Running Man starring Arnold Schwarzenegger depicts an autocratic government using computers to digitally replace the faces of actors with those of wanted fugitives to make it appear the fugitives had been neutralized.
 In the 1992 techno-thriller A Philosophical Investigation by Philip Kerr, "Wittgenstein", the main character and a serial killer, makes use of both a software similar to deepfake and a virtual reality suit for having sex with an avatar of Isadora "Jake" Jakowicz, the female police lieutenant assigned to catch him.
 The 1993 film Rising Sun starring Sean Connery and Wesley Snipes depicts another character, Jingo Asakuma, who reveals that a computer disc has digitally altered personal identities to implicate a competitor.
  Deepfake technology is part of the plot of the 2019 BBC One drama The Capture. The series follows British ex-soldier Shaun Emery, who is accused of assaulting and abducting his barrister. Expertly doctored CCTV footage is used to set him up and mislead the police investigating him.
 Al Davis vs. the NFL: The narrative structure of this 2021 documentary, part of ESPN's 30 for 30 documentary series, uses deepfake versions of the film's two central characters, both deceased—Al Davis, who owned the Las Vegas Raiders during the team's tenure in Oakland and Los Angeles, and Pete Rozelle, the NFL commissioner who frequently clashed with Davis.
 Deepfake technology is featured in "Impawster Syndrome", the 57th episode of the Canadian police series Hudson & Rex, first broadcast on 6 January 2022, in which a member of the St. John's police team is investigated on suspicion of robbery and assault due to doctored CCTV footage using his likeness.
 Using deepfake technology in his music video for his 2022 single, "The Heart Part 5", musician Kendrick Lamar transformed into figures resembling Nipsey Hussle, O.J. Simpson, and Kanye West, among others. The deepfake technology in the video was created by Deep Voodoo, a studio led by Trey Parker and Matt Stone, who created South Park.
 Aloe Blacc honored his long-time collaborator Avicii four years after his death by performing their song "Wake Me Up" in English, Spanish, and Mandarin, using deepfake technologies.

See also
 15.ai
 Computer facial animation
 Digital cloning
 Facial motion capture
 Hyperreality
 Identity replacement technology
 Interactive online characters
 Regulation of artificial intelligence
 StyleGAN
 Synthetic media
 Uncanny valley
 Virtual actor

References

External links

Fake/Spoof Audio Detection Challenge (ASVspoof)
Deepfake Detection Challenge (DFDC)
Bibliography: Media Literacy in the Age of Deepfakes. Curated by Dr Joshua Glick.

Applications of computer vision
Applications of artificial intelligence
Computer graphics
Deep learning
Identity theft
Special effects
2010s neologisms
Internet memes introduced in 2020
Articles containing video clips
 
Media studies
2018 neologisms